Rhamphochromis ferox is a species of piscivorous cichlid endemic to deep waters of Lake Malawi and the upper reaches of the Shire River.  This species can reach a length of  TL.  It can also be found in the aquarium trade.

References

ferox
Taxa named by Charles Tate Regan
Fish described in 1922
Taxonomy articles created by Polbot